Cadmium stearate  is a salt with the formula Cd(O2CC17H35)2.  Classified as a metallic soap, this a white solid is used as a lubricant and as a heat- and light-stabilizer in polyvinyl chloride.  The use of cadmium stearate is being phased out because of its toxicity.

Synthesis
The compound is produced by the reaction of cadmium chloride with sodium stearate or heating stearic acid and cadmium oxide or hydroxide.
Also, an exchange reaction between cadmium sulfate and sodium stearate:

Safety 
Like other cadmium compounds, cadmium stearate is toxic. Cadmium stearate is also carcinogen.

References 

Cadmium compounds
Stearates